Ceryx aroa is a moth of the subfamily Arctiinae. It was described by George Thomas Bethune-Baker in 1904. It is found in New Guinea.

References

Ceryx (moth)
Moths described in 1904